Fred Wilcox may refer to:

 Fred M. Wilcox (director) (1907–1964), American film director
 Fred M. Wilcox (South Dakota politician) (1858–?), South Dakota state senator
 Fred M. Wilcox (Wisconsin politician) (1870–1944), Wisconsin state senator
 Fred A. Wilcox, American writer
 Fred Wilcox (footballer) (1922–2015), English footballer (Chester FC)

See also
 Freddie Wilcox (1881–1958), English footballer